The Philippine–Japanese Friendship Tower is a monument in Bagac, Bataan, Philippines.

History
After World War II, Japan started rebuilding its relations with the Philippines which also saw Japanese nationals doing civic programs in Bataan in cooperation with the local government despite anti-Japanese sentiment in Bataan due to the war.

Risshō Kōsei Kai (RKK), a Japanese Buddhist religious group and locals who later established the Bataan Christian Youth Civic Circle were responsible for raising the monument. The monument was inaugurated on April 8, 1975 and is meant to commemorate the cordial Post-World War II Japan–Philippines relations. On the following day, a bell which was imported from Japan was ceremonially rang by then Bagac Mayor Atilano Ricardo and RKK youth head Rev. Kinjiro Niwano.

Monument
The Friendship Tower is a structure which consists of three pillars joined by rings. The structure also hosts a hanged peace.

References

Buildings and structures in Bataan
World War II memorials in the Philippines
Friendship Tower